Nemanja Dabić (Serbian Cyrillic: Немања Дабић; born 20 September 1986 in Sombor) is a Serbian footballer who plays for FK Hajduk Kula. He is a left-back, defender player.

References

External links
 Nemanja Dabic

1986 births
Living people
Sportspeople from Sombor
Serbian footballers
FK Hajduk Kula players
Serbian SuperLiga players
Association football defenders